Albert Edmund Parker, 3rd Earl of Morley PC, DL, JP (11 June 1843 – 26 February 1905), styled Viscount Boringdon until 1864, was a British peer and Liberal, later Liberal Unionist politician.

Background and education
Morley was the son of Edmund Parker, 2nd Earl of Morley, and Harriet Sophia (née Parker). He was educated at Eton and Balliol College, Oxford.

Political career
Morley succeeded his father as third Earl of Morley in 1864 and took his seat on the Liberal benches in the House of Lords. He served under William Ewart Gladstone as a Lord-in-waiting from 1868 to 1874 and as Under-Secretary of State for War from 1880 to 1885. In February 1886 he was admitted to the Privy Council and appointed First Commissioner of Works, a position he only held until April of the same year. He broke with Gladstone over Irish Home Rule and joined the Liberal Unionists. From 1889 to 1905 Morley was chairman of committees and a Deputy Speaker of the House of Lords.

Apart from his career in national politics Morley was Chairman of Devon County Council and a Justice of the Peace and Deputy Lieutenant for Devon. He also served as President of the first day of the 1886 Co-operative Congress.

Marriage and children
Lord Morley married Margaret Holford, eldest daughter of Robert Stayner Holford, in 1876. They had three sons and a daughter:

 Edmund Robert Parker, 4th Earl of Morley (born 19 April 1877, died 10 October 1951)
 Captain Montagu Brownlow Parker, 5th Earl of Morley (born 13 October 1878, died 28 April 1962)
 Lady Mary Theresa Parker (born 13 December 1881, died 2 November 1932)
 John Holford Parker (born 22 June 1886, died 27 February 1955), father of John St Aubyn Parker, 6th Earl of Morley

Lord Morley died in February 1905, aged 61, and was succeeded in his titles by his eldest son, Edmund. Lady Morley died in 1908.

References

1843 births
1905 deaths
Alumni of Balliol College, Oxford
Deputy Lieutenants of Devon
3
Liberal Party (UK) Lords-in-Waiting
People educated at Eton College
Presidents of Co-operative Congress
Liberal Party (UK) hereditary peers
Liberal Unionist Party peers
Members of the Privy Council of the United Kingdom
Members of Devon County Council
English justices of the peace